Mount Haystack is a mountain in the Great Range of the Adirondack High Peaks in the Adirondack Mountains of New York. It is the third highest peak in the state, after Algonquin Peak and Mount Marcy. It gets its name from the resemblance of its rounded, conical peak to a haystack.

Despite this and the views offered from its bare, alpine summit, it is not visited by as many hikers outside aspiring members of the Adirondack Forty-Sixers; it is rather remote from the nearest trailhead and the approach from either direction is steep and challenging.

The most frequent approach of Haystack as the main goal is to follow the Johns Brook Trail from the popular Garden parking area in Keene Valley to the Phelps Trail and then use Shorey's Short Cut to get over to the Range Trail. It is possible to combine this with an attempt on Marcy itself, but that makes for a long day and the approach from Panther Gorge is even steeper than that from the north.

Some hikers come along the Great Range itself, making the peak their last stop before Marcy itself, or combine it with neighboring Basin and Saddleback. It can also be approached from privately owned Upper Ausable Lake.

One of the most famous elements of Haystack is the infamous "Devil's Half Mile". This stretch, which is technically , is the extremely steep last stretch of the trail.

Gallery

References

External links
 
  Peakbagger.com: Mount Haystack
  Summitpost.org: Mount Haystack

Mountains of Essex County, New York
Adirondack High Peaks
Mountains of New York (state)